The year 590 BC was a year of the pre-Julian Roman calendar. In the Roman Empire, it was known as year 164 Ab urbe condita . The denomination 590 BC for this year has been used since the early medieval period, when the Anno Domini calendar era became the prevalent method in Europe for naming years.

Events
 The Medians invade the Kingdom of Urartu, causing the fall of that kingdom.

Births

Deaths
 Eurycratides, Agiad king of Sparta
 Rusa III, king of Urartu (or 615 BC)

References